Venus Wong Man-yik is a Hong Kong actress currently contracted to TVB and TVB Music Group.

Biography

Early life
Venus Wong was born in 1992 in Huizhou, Guangdong province and moved to Hong Kong at the age of one with her mother. She attended Christ Church Ching Wan Primary School and Rosehill School.

Career
In 2006, Wong participated in the television show Y2K Series (Y2K系列) at the age of 14. In 2008, she made her film debut in the movie High Noon (烈日當空) as a supporting character. In the same year, she appeared in the TV show “性本善” and played a waitress in the film Forgive and Forget (親愛的). Wong had appeared in a number of supporting roles in films, such as To Love or Not to Love, Camera and Lucky Boy. After playing a few more minor roles, she studied French at the City University of Hong Kong before dropping out in 2012 to study Drama in New York. She had also appeared in numerous TV commercials and had promoted brands such as Olympus, Nokia and Brandy.

In 2013, Wong filmed her first TVB drama Never Dance Alone, playing the younger version of Rachel Lee’s character. The drama was broadcast in 2014. In 2020, she signed contracts with TVB and The Voice Entertainment（now known as TVB Music Group）.

Personal life
In 2019, Wong married Hong Kong actor Derek Tsang at Niki Hills, Hokkaido, Japan.

Filmography

Films

Television dramas

TVB

Shaw Brothers Pictures

ViuTV

Awards and nominations

References

External links
 

1992 births
21st-century Chinese actresses
People from Huizhou
Hong Kong women artists
Living people